Juliana Mialoundama (born March 18, 1993, in Angers, France) is a French basketball player who plays for club Arras PA of the League feminine de basket the top basketball league in France.

References

French women's basketball players
1993 births
Living people
Sportspeople from Angers